Jon Eriksson Helland II (1849–1869) was a Norwegian Hardanger fiddle maker from Bø in Telemark.

The eldest son of Erik Jonsson Helland, Jon died at 20 years of age. He was considered very gifted, and his father had great expectations for him, as seen from the fact that he took him on his travels to Kristiania (now Oslo) and Horten.

Because of his early death, he did not make many violins. However, it is likely that he would have been a greater violin maker still, than his father.

See also
 The Helland fiddle maker family

References

External links
The Helland fiddle maker family

1849 births
1869 deaths
Norwegian musical instrument makers
Fiddle makers